Nizhny Chir is a rural locality (a stanitsa) and the administrative center of Nizhnechirskoye Rural Settlement, Surovikinsky District, Volgograd Oblast, Russia. The population was 4,038 as of 2010. There are 66 streets.

Geography 
Nizhny Chir is located on the right bank of the Chir River, 46 km southeast of Surovikino (the district's administrative centre) by road. Blizhnepodgorsky is the nearest rural locality.

References 

Rural localities in Surovikinsky District
Don Host Oblast